Cunupia is a town in central Trinidad. It is part of the Borough of Chaguanas.  Cunupia is just northeast of Chaguanas proper.  Like Chaguanas itself, Cunupia has experienced rapid growth in recent years, especially in terms of residential developments.

References

Chaguanas
Populated places in Trinidad and Tobago